Jobber, in merchandising, can be synonymous with "wholesaler", "distributor", or "intermediary". A business which buys goods and bulk products from importers, other wholesalers, or manufacturers, and then sells to retailers, was historically called a jobbing house (or jobbing center). A jobber is a merchant—e.g., (i) a wholesaler or (ii) reseller or (iii) independent distributor operating on consignment—who takes goods in quantity from manufacturers or importers and sells or resells or distributes them to retail chains and syndicates, particularly supermarkets, department stores, drug chains, and the like. One objective is to distribute goods at lower costs through economies of scale, which, in sophisticated operations, typically uses complex transportation models. In competitive markets, the practice is an integral part of supply chain management—one that might incorporate, among other things, operations research in areas of logistics involving supply chain networking, and supply chain optimization. A jobber is very different from a broker. A broker transacts on behalf of a merchandiser while a jobber supplies inventory at a merchandiser's site for consumers to purchase.

Usage and etymology 
The word "jobber" is sometimes dismissed as colloquial or obsolete. As of 2016, it is used in the industry sciences, trade press, popular media, and scholarly journals. The current meaning of jobber has been in existence since the introduction of the factory system, and earlier in cases with respect to importing goods. The word has a longstanding history in merchandising and can be found in print around the mid-19th century. and variations, such as "pig jobber", date back to the 18th century. Jobbing was the subject of legislation in England in 1670 when a special act was enacted to prevent fraud in the buying and selling of cattle at Smithfield Market, London.
CRC jobber see M George.

Used in the following contexts 
 Car lot jobber (as in fruits and vegetables) (1914)
 Fuel jobber
 Rack jobber
 Jobbing house
 Stockjobber
 Record jobber
 Pig jobber
 Land jobber (1800)
 Jobber (1719)
 CRC Jobber (2004)

See also 

 Jobbers Canyon Historic District, Omaha, Nebraska

References

Notes

Citations

External links 
A description of "jobbing house" businesses from 1923

Business terms
Distribution (marketing)
Sales occupations
Wholesaling